The Hamburg Masters was an international field hockey tournament held by the German Hockey Federation.

History
The Hamburg Masters was introduced to international hockey in 1989. 

Following its introduction, the Hamburg Masters began being played on an annual basis in 1996. The tournament was only omitted on two occasions, in 1999 and 2011. In 2012, the decision was made to move the tournament to different venues on a bi-annual basis, continuing play in Hamburg in uneven years, while moving to Düsseldorf in even years.

Results

Summaries

1989–1998

2000–2009

2010–2018

Team appearances

References

External links
Deutscher Hockey-Bund

 Hamburg Masters
International field hockey competitions hosted by Germany
1989 establishments in West Germany
2018 disestablishments in Germany